The Apple Dot Matrix Printer (often shortened to Apple DMP) is a printer manufactured by C. Itoh and sold under the Apple Computer, Inc. label in 1982 for the Apple II series, Lisa, and the Apple III. It was succeeded by the ImageWriter in 1984.

The Apple DMP is the last parallel port printer sold under the Apple label; all subsequent Apple printers (ImageWriter, ImageWriter II, Scribe, LaserWriter, etc.) were serial port printers.

References 

 
 *

External links 
 AppleSpec on Apple Dot Matrix printer
 User Manuals

Apple Inc. printers
Computer-related introductions in 1982